New European, may refer to either:
 The New European, a weekly pop-up newspaper published in 2016
 New European Recordings, a music label of Douglas Pearce